Jordan Harbinger is an American podcaster and radio personality.

Education and early career 
Harbinger received his undergraduate and law degrees from the University of Michigan. He later became a lawyer.

Harbinger was kidnapped twice, once in Mexico and again in Serbia. He ran a tour company that took westerners to North Korea via China and has spent significant time in the country. Tours were supervised from beginning to end by North Korean minders and tour guides.

In 2007 Harbinger worked on mortgage-backed securities for a Wall Street firm and was laid off after approximately a year due to the 2007 financial crisis.

Media career 
While in law school, Harbinger started coaching others on how to date and network. He and co-host AJ Harbinger (who uses Jordan Harbinger's last name as a pseudonym) started The PickUp Podcast. When Harbinger graduated in 2006, he moved to New York. Around that time he formed a company called The Art of Charm to turn his coaching into a business.

By that time his podcast had gained traction, and he started focusing full-time on the coaching business. In 2010 an app was launched, and by 2011 Harbinger had a radio talk show called Game On on both Sirius and XM Satellite that aired on Friday nights.  The show was the first-ever podcast carried on satellite radio. By 2011, Harbinger had relocated to Los Angeles. Meanwhile, his company had begun to offer week-long "boot camps", as well as other options, such as coaching over the phone.

In 2013 Harbinger demonstrated at DEF CON how easily a person can be manipulated into divulging information to someone who may not be what they claim to be, based on the Robin Sage experiment of 2010.

By 2015, Harbinger was rebranding himself more as a more general self-help personality and was profiling celebrities in the podcasts.

In early 2018, Harbinger split from his former partners, left The Art of Charm podcast, and started a new podcast under his own name. The new show, The Jordan Harbinger Show, was listed by Apple as one of the most downloaded new shows of 2018 and brings in seven-figure numbers in revenue each year. Harbinger interviews scientists, entertainers, athletes, artists, leaders, and spies; he also provides self-help advice in professional networking, social skills, human dynamics, social engineering, and psychology. The Jordan Harbinger Show releases episodes three times per week and receives over six million downloads each month and 250,000 downloads per episode as of 2020.

Harbinger interviewed Billy McFarland while McFarland was in federal prison. During the interview, McFarland admitted guilt publicly for the first time. The interview was filmed by ABC News and featured in season 1, episode 4 of The Con.

Harbinger has contributed articles to Newsweek Magazine and Entrepreneur. He is a recurring guest on The Adam Carolla Show and in 2021 signed a "high seven-figure" renewal deal on the PodcastOne network.

References

External links
 
 

Living people
University of Michigan alumni
University of Michigan Law School alumni
American podcasters
People from Ann Arbor, Michigan
1980 births